This is a list of lists of legislation in the United Kingdom

Acts
This is a list of lists of Acts of the several Parliaments and Assemblies that exist or formerly existed in the United Kingdom and the former Kingdoms of Great Britain, England, Scotland and Ireland, grouped by the Parliament or Assembly that passed them. It also contains information on series of Acts of similar purpose.

For Acts of the Parliament of the United Kingdom established in 1801, see List of Acts of the Parliament of the United Kingdom.

For Acts of the Parliaments abolished in 1707 and 1801 by the Acts of Union 1707 and Acts of Union 1800, see:
List of Acts of the Parliament of England (1225–1707) 
List of Acts of the Parliament of Scotland to 1707
List of Acts of the Parliament of Ireland to 1700
List of Acts of the Parliament of Ireland, 1701 to 1800
List of Acts of the Parliament of Great Britain (1707–1800)

See also:
List of Acts of the Scottish Parliament for the devolved Parliament established by the Scotland Act 1998
List of Acts of the Parliament of Northern Ireland for the 1921–1972 Home Rule Parliament
List of Acts of the Northern Ireland Assembly for the devolved Assembly established in 1999
List of Acts and Measures of Senedd Cymru for the devolved Assembly and Parliament

The original Acts of Parliament are held by the Parliamentary Archives. Legislation.gov.uk provides the revised editions of the legislation of the United Kingdom.

Note that some Acts consolidate and reorganise prior Acts; these are called consolidation Acts.

Series

 Inclosure Acts (various, mainly 1750 to 1860)
 Factory Acts (1802, 1833, 1844, 1847, 1850, 1867, 1874, 1891)
 Regency Acts
 Witchcraft Acts (various)

Statutes
List of English statutes

Measures
List of Acts and Measures of Senedd Cymru 
List of Measures of the Northern Ireland Assembly (1973) 
List of Church of England Measures

Instruments
List of statutory instruments of the United Kingdom
List of Statutory Instruments of Scotland
List of Church of England Instruments

Rules
List of statutory rules of Northern Ireland

Orders
List of Orders in Council for Northern Ireland
List of regulatory reform orders

Statutory rules and orders
List of Statutory Rules and Orders of the United Kingdom
List of Statutory Rules and Orders of Northern Ireland

See also
 Acts of Parliament in the United Kingdom
 Halsbury's Statutes

External links